Community technology is the practice of synergizing the efforts of individuals, community technology centers and national organizations with federal policy initiatives around broadband, information access, education, and economic development.

National organizations efforts include:
 Developing effective language 
 Executing and sharing strategies
 Sharing assets
 Pushing policy agendas
 Creating marketing boiler templates
 Tracking and sharing trends

Local organizations efforts include:
 Helping with national fundraising
 Educating local constituents about national issues
 Providing meaningful feedback
 Helping with grassroots organizing
 Piloting innovate projects

Individual efforts include:

 Asset sharing and collaboration both locally, nationally and internationally
 Embracing new technology and improving access to its effective use
 Building capacity for inclusion and accessibility

History

See also
Community technology center
Community informatics
Broadband

References
 

Technology in society